The 26th Grey Cup was played on December 10, 1938, before 18,778 fans at Varsity Stadium at Toronto.

The Toronto Argonauts defeated the Winnipeg Blue Bombers 30–7.

External links
 
 

Grey Cup
Grey Cups hosted in Toronto
Grey Cup
1938 in Ontario
December 1938 sports events
1930s in Toronto
Toronto Argonauts
Winnipeg Blue Bombers